BYOP may refer to:

 Be Your Own Pet, a punk/garage rock band
 Bring your own phone, a phone use policy in the workplace